"It All Begins With You" is the final single from Jody Watley's third album, Affairs of the Heart. Reaching number 80 on the U.S. R&B chart, it became her first solo single to miss the pop chart.

Charts

References

External links

Jody Watley songs
1992 singles
Songs written by Denise Eisenberg Rich
1992 songs
MCA Records singles